Flight of Refugees Across Wrecked Bridge in Korea is a Pulitzer Prize-winning photograph by Associated Press photographer Max Desfor, taken on December 4, 1950, at a destroyed bridge over the Taedong River near Pyongyang, North Korea.  Desfor was covering the Korean War at the time.

Background

During the Korean War, the Battle of Inchon turned the tide against the Korean People's Army (NKPA) for the Americans who were fighting under the United Nations Command. The U.S. Eighth Army, which made up most of the United Nations forces, then raced to the Chinese border but were defeated in the Battle of the Ch'ongch'on River after the entry of large numbers of Chinese troops on the North Korean side. United Nations forces were sent in retreat back down the Korean peninsula, and the  retreat was the longest in U.S. military history.

Taking the photo
Desfor, a photographer for the Associated Press, was travelling with the front line troops and even took part in a parachute jump with the 187th Infantry Regiment. After American troops started fleeing south, Desfor was able to commandeer a Jeep with two other reporters and an army signal corpsman headed south. They crossed the Taedong River at a United Nations pontoon bridge.  While driving along the river's southern shore they observed Korean refugees crossing the river on foot where it was iced over, and using small boats where the river was open. Further down the southern shore they came across a destroyed bridge where they saw thousands of Koreans trying to cross the shattered girders of the bridge. It was December 4, 1950, at the beginning of winter, and Desfor had trouble working his camera because of the freezing temperatures.

Desfor's 2010 visit to Korea
In June 2010, Desfor returned to Korea for the 60th anniversary of the war and he shared some of his thoughts. "I ask anyone who'll listen – why do they celebrate the start of the war? They celebrate the start, of course, because it's never ending – it's still going on." Desfor also talked about his time on the front line with the troops and, while proud of his Pulitzer Prize-winning photograph, believes that he took better photos during the war. Regarding the war itself he says, "The Korean War is labelled 'the Forgotten War', and the main reason is [American GIs] never got a parade when they got back, they never got relief, they never were cited for their effort for the work that was done. They were just completely forgotten."

See also
1951 Pulitzer Prize

Bibliography
Notes

References 

 - Total pages: 1136 

 - Total pages: 276 
 - Total pages: 225 

1950 in the United States
1950 works
1950 in art
Black-and-white photographs
Korean War photographs
Pulitzer Prize-winning photographs
1950 in North Korea
Associated Press
Works about bridges
1950s photographs